Scott Mayer may refer to:
 Scott Mayer (racing driver) (born 1964), race car driver
 Scott Mayer (bishop) (born 1955), fifth Bishop of the Episcopal Diocese of Northwest Texas

See also
Scott Meyer (disambiguation)